Now That's What I Call Disney is a compilation album from the Now! series released in the United Kingdom as a 3-disc set on November 21, 2011. It was re-released the following year with a bonus disc of Disney-related Christmas songs. An abbreviated single-disc version was released in the United States on November 6, 2012. The UK version takes songs from the vast Disney library from its animated classics, Pixar films and live-action performances from Hannah Montana and High School Musical. The US version, at 20 tracks, contains songs only from Disney and Pixar animated features. In the United States, Now That's What I Call Disney 2 was released in November 2013 and Now That's What I Call Disney 3 was released in October 2014.

Three reissues of the album, featuring songs from newer animated classics, Pixar films and live-action television shows and films, have been released in the UK; one in 2014, one in 2017, and one in 2021. A companion album, Now That's What I Call Disney Bedtime, was released in 2018.

UK track listing

US track listing

Reception

Reviews for the UK edition say it's "pretty hard not to love this album" and "a perfect Christmas treat for anyone with children, grandchildren or a sense of nostalgia".

In his review of the US version for Allmusic, John Bush claims that the album "is understandably heavy on films that came after Disney's '90s renaissance," but also says "the collection finds plenty of space for songs from the earlier generation of Disney classics."

Charts

UK version

US version

Release history

References

External links
 Official U.S. Now That's What I Call Music website

2012 compilation albums
Disney
Disney
EMI Records compilation albums
Walt Disney Records compilation albums